Dobrova is a settlement in the hills north of Senovo in the Municipality of Krško in eastern Slovenia. It is a dispersed settlement made up of smaller hamlets such as Bukovšica, Dobrova, Na Terogu, Prebkovje, Puste Ložice, and Plešivec, as well as isolated farms. The area is part of the traditional region of Styria. It is now included with the rest of the municipality in the Lower Sava Statistical Region.

References

External links
Dobrova on Geopedia

Populated places in the Municipality of Krško